Juan Bautista Vigil y Alarid (1792–1866) was acting Governor of New Mexico in 1846 during the period when the United States consolidated military rule over the former territory of Mexico following the Mexican–American War. As such, Alarid was the last Mexican governor of New Mexico.

Early career
Juan Bautista Vigil y Alarid was born in Santa Fe, New Mexico in 1792, son of Domingo Vigil and María Francisca Alarid, both from military families.
In 1808 he married Rafaela Sánchez in Tomé, New Mexico.
After the independence of Mexico from Spain in 1821, he became secretary of state to the first Mexican governor of New Mexico, Francisco Javier Chávez.
He was to serve in various positions in the New Mexican government until the United States take-over.

New Mexico was at first a province of the Estado interno del Norte, with capital in Chihuahua.  
In May 1824 Vigil was New Mexican deputy to the state congress in Chihuahua.
As of 6 July 1824, New Mexico was made a separate territory, with El Paso del Norte (now called Ciudad Juárez) transferred from New Mexico to the State of Chihuahua, a move that Vigil opposed. In 1826 Vigil was appointed customs collector by the central government, in charge of regulating the trade with the United States via the Santa Fe Trail, 
a difficult position and one in which he came to blows with the trader Charles Bent.

Acting governor

Vigil y Alarid was left in charge as acting Governor of New Mexico when his predecessor Manuel Armijo fled Santa Fe to escape the approaching U.S. troops under General Stephen W. Kearny. On 19 August 1846 he accepted the defeat of New Mexico and pledged the loyalty of himself and his fellow citizens to the United States.
In his speech he said, presumably reflecting the views of other leading citizens:

In September 1846 Kearny appointed Charles Bent as Vigil y Alarid's successor.

Later career

Vigil y Alarid moved south to Aldama, just north of Chihuahua city, some time before 1851.
He was elected to the local council of Guadelupe on 10 February 1852.
The head of the council was Father Ramón Ortiz, who was also the commissioner of repatriation for emigrants from New Mexico.
He participated with Ortiz in organizing the festivities for Mexican Independence Day on 16 September 1852.
However, Vigil testified against Ortiz during an investigation of his activities as emigrant commissioner the next year, that led to dismissal of Ortiz. After 1846, Alarid y Vigil fought for the rights of Mexicans by using the Treaty of Guadalupe Hidalgo to their advantage, until he considered that, in fact, his Mexican homeland "had died." After losing a political office in New Mexico, he ended up allying with Mexico again and defended the old loyalties.

Little is known about Vigil's later life until his death in 1866.

References
Citations

Sources

1792 births
1866 deaths
Mexican governors of Santa Fe de Nuevo México
19th-century American politicians